Rudra Kaushish (born Gajendra Oza in Jodhpur, 25 May 1973) is an Indian film and television actor and producer.

Early life 

Before joining the film and television industry, Kaushish served as Sub Inspector in Central Reserve Police Force for 12 years from 1995 to 2007.

Career 
Rudra worked in feature films and television. He is best known for playing the role of Mahinder Singh Gill in Kulfi Kumar Bajewala.< As a producer he is the head of Rekha G Films.

Filmography

Television

Films

Production

See also 

 List of Indian television actors

References

External links
 
 

1973 births
Living people